Aandavan may refer to:

 Aatank Hi Aatank, a 1995 Bollywood film, dubbed into Tamil in 2000 as Aandavan
 Aandavan (2008 film), a 2008 Malayalam language film